Serious Sam: The First Encounter is a first-person shooter video game developed by Croteam and originally published by Gathering of Developers, first released on Microsoft Windows on 21 March 2001. It had been in development since 1996 and had videos showing its early gameplay in 2000. The First Encounter was originally developed by Croteam as a demonstrator for their engine, which was why some countries saw its initial release priced at less than half the price of other games in the genre. This game was followed by a sequel, Serious Sam: The Second Encounter, released eleven months later.

The series follows the adventures of protagonist Sam "Serious" Stone and his fight against the forces of the notorious extraterrestrial overlord Mental, who seeks to destroy humanity. Sam travels through various locations in Ancient Egypt, fighting hordes of Mental's army with a wide arsenal of weapons including shotguns, a minigun, a rocket launcher, and a high-powered portable cannon.

Both The First Encounter and The Second Encounter were combined into one game and ported to the Xbox. High-definition remakes of both episodes were released in 2009 and 2010 on Microsoft Windows, and were later ported to the Xbox 360, Nintendo Switch, PlayStation 4, and Xbox One video game consoles.

Gameplay 

Serious Sam: The First Encounter'''s gameplay consists almost entirely of the player attempting to defeat dozens of enemies at a time in wide open arena-like areas and thus is relatively simple. The game's story establishes the reasons and methods for how the player travels from chapter to chapter through the game's menu system, a brain implant called NETRISCA that also provides hints, descriptions of enemy types, and information on weapons the player collects. Enemies spawn frequently and attack in large waves from across the game map, and the player is meant to dodge their projectiles and physical attacks by jumping and strafing rather than by taking cover. Health and armor are non-regenerative on all difficulty levels except for the easiest and instead are replenished with health and armor packs which are littered throughout the game. Available health and armor integrity are represented by percentage numbers on the screen. The combat is high-paced and frenetic, with each level consisting of a series of elaborate arenas, in which the player will defeat a set number of re-spawning enemies before proceeding to the next. Enemies range from "Beheaded", which are normal soldiers armed with rocket launchers and energy weapons, to "Beheaded Kamikazes" who charge at the player while screaming loudly until they explode, to more powerful alien foes such as charging bulls, alien robots with rockets and miniguns, and creatures made of lava that can split themselves into smaller enemies upon death.

The player can carry a number of weapons such as twin revolvers with unlimited ammo, shotguns, a minigun, a rocket launcher, a quad laser gun, and a cannon that can kill multiple enemies at a time. Ammunition is scattered across levels that the player must pick up to reload, but players can also explore the level's environments to find secret items including more health, ammo, and weapons that they might otherwise only find later in the game. Unfortunately, some items are planted as bait for traps and may trigger a spawn of more enemies when the player collects them.

The game features cooperative gameplay through a split-screen mode and via the internet.

 Plot 
In ancient times, Earth was involved in a massive conflict between Mental, an evil extraterrestrial being who seeks to conquer all life in the universe, and the Sirians, a technologically advanced race of humanoid aliens. Although the Sirians were ultimately defeated, they left behind remnants of their advanced technology, which were later discovered by modern humans at the dawn of the 21st century and used to develop the means for human civilization to explore other galaxies and establish many interstellar colonies. In the 22nd century, Mental suddenly reappears and leads his vast army of aliens from planet to planet, destroying every colony until he finally reaches Earth. As a last resort, humanity's leaders decide to use the "Time-Lock", an ancient Sirian artifact that contains the power to send a single person back to a chosen point in time. Sam "Serious" Stone, a soldier whose bravery in fighting the aliens has made him a living symbol of human resistance, is recruited to go back in time to when Mental was fighting the Sirians in the hope that he might find a way to eliminate Mental and change the course of history.

As the game opens, Sam appears in Egypt during the time of the Pharaohs, guided by an AI called NETRISCA. He visits several locations, including the Valley of the Kings, to collect religious icons representing the four elements of Water, Earth, Air, and Fire while battling hordes of aliens sent by Mental to stop him. He then travels to the abandoned city of Memphis, where he finds a fifth relic, the icon of Amon-Ra, in the Temple of Ptah. NETRISCA then instructs him to go to Thebes, which results in a long and difficult trek through the desert during which Sam is forced to dump most of his ammo in order to lighten his load.

At Thebes, Sam works his way through the city until he reaches a sanctuary where he manages to activate a hidden Sirian communicator concealed in an obelisk in the heart of Luxor, which summons a Sirian starship to Earth from deep space. Sam rushes to the Great Pyramids of Giza in order to rendezvous with the starship, only to be cornered by Mental's top general and most powerful warrior, Ugh Zan III. After defeating the giant by using the Sirian technology built into the pyramids to weaken him, Sam then teleports himself onto the starship, dubbed the "SSS Centerprice". He finds a payphone and leaves a message for Mental telling him that he has a "special delivery package" for him and sets a course to Sirius, the Sirian homeworld. The story ends with Sam breaking the fourth wall by telling the player that its "bedtime" as the game indicates that his story will continue.

 Development 
Croteam began developing the game in 1996 formally titled In the Flesh. It was coined to be a first-person shooter with a dark and horror setting. They've opted to develop their own engine for the game due to licensing costs for other engines at the time being too high. Over time, the tone of the game changed from its dark horror to a bright and colorful setting, and began developing Serious Sam. Croteam did not have a way to playtest the game on as many systems as possible to fully optimize the game, so they opted to release public demos in 2000 on Gamespy to have players try out builds to better improve the game. Sam's voice actor John J. Dick was one of the players to try out the public demo, and after writing to Croteam expressing his interest to help voice the character for the English release of the game, he was officially hired to voice the titular character since then.

Croteam created their own engine for use in both The First Encounter and The Second Encounter. Named the "Serious Engine", it is designed to cope with extremely large view distances and massive numbers of models by implementing level of detail rendering. Most contemporary FPS engines were developed for a limited draw distance and only a few animating models (i.e. enemies) on screen at a time. The Serious Engine is very efficient, capable of maintaining dozens of moving enemies (often stampedes) and enormous enemies, even on a modest system challenging the well known id Tech, Unreal Engine or Source engines. The "Serious Engine" can render through both Direct3D or OpenGL and, while it does not support pixel or vertex shaders, it is optimized for Direct3D 7's hardware transformation, clipping and lighting. The "Serious Engine" is available for licensing from Croteam.

A more powerful iteration of the "Serious Engine" was developed for use in Serious Sam 2 and is known as "Serious Engine 2". It supports many features of modern GPUs such as pixel and vertex shaders, HDR, bloom, and parallax mapping.

Serious Engine 3 was used in Serious Sam HD: The First Encounter and Serious Sam HD: The Second Encounter. It includes detailed shading, and enemies are completely remodeled to look more realistic. This engine is also being developed to harness the full capacity of HDR and High Definition mapping. An updated version, Serious Engine 3.5, is used in Serious Sam 3: BFE.

The latest version is the Serious Engine 4, which Croteam used in their most recent game, The Talos Principle.

In March 2016, Croteam released Serious Engine v1.10 as free and open source software on GitHub under the GNU GPL-2-0-only.

 Xbox version 
On 12 November 2002, both The First Encounter and The Second Encounter were combined into one game and ported to the Xbox titled Serious Sam. The game had notable differences from the PC counterparts, including the model of Sam being changed from the model of The First Encounter to a more cartoon style Sam, removing the shades to make him look less like Duke Nukem and more like he does today.

The Xbox version includes all of the levels from both PC games, though some were modified due to the memory constraints of the Xbox console. As a result, the levels were made smaller by removing the areas outside of the playing area, and some larger levels were split into two smaller ones. Unlike the PC versions where the player can walk almost infinitely away from the playing area, the game restricts them from going too far.

The gameplay was given a more arcade touch. A life system was implemented into the single-player game making use of the score. The player is granted a new life for every 100,000 points, which allows respawning at the place of death rather than at a save point. Combo points were added for killing multiple enemies at the same time, which allows a faster increase in the player's score.

Further changes to the game include the addition of treasure, weapons that were added into The Second Encounter can now be found in some of The First Encounter levels, and a different save system. Due to the hardware limitations of the Xbox, instead of allowing the player to manually save at any point during a level in the PC versions, there are save points that are designated by red phone booths that can be found in each level. Auto-aiming was also added to the Xbox version to compensate for the degree of control usually offered by a keyboard and mouse setup.

The Xbox Serious Sam was nominated for GameSpots 2002 "Best Shooter on Xbox" award, which went to MechAssault.

 Reception 

Kevin Rice reviewed the PC version of the game for Next Generation, rating it four stars out of five, and stated that "Hmmm, should you get Deer Hunter XXII Extreme Plus [...] or Serious Sam for the same price? This is a no-brainer purchase for any FPS gamer."

In the United States, Serious Sam: The First Encounter sold 83,000 copies by October 2001.The First Encounter was the recipient of various editorial and consumer praise, with an overall review ratio of 87/100 on Metacritic. It also received numerous awards, including multiple Game of the Year awards.Serious Sam won The Electric Playground''s "Best Independent PC Game" prize, and was a nominee in the show's "Best Shooter for PC", "Best Graphics in a PC Game" and "Best Action Game for PC" categories.

 Game of the Year 2001 — GameSpot

Notes

References

External links 
 

2001 video games
Devolver Digital games
First-person shooters
Gathering of Developers games
Global Star Software games
Indie video games
Multiplayer and single-player video games
Palm OS games
Serious Sam
Split-screen multiplayer games
Video games about time travel
Video games developed in Croatia
Video games set in Egypt
Windows games
Xbox games